Please Like Me is an Australian television comedy-drama series created by and starring Josh Thomas. Thomas also serves as a writer for most episodes. The series premiered on 28 February 2013 on ABC2 in Australia and is now available on Netflix The show explores realistic issues with humorous tones; the executive producer, Todd Abbott, had pitched the show as a drama rather than a sitcom. The show aired later on the United States network Pivot, which then helped to develop the show from its second season onwards. Four seasons of the show have been broadcast, and creator Thomas has stated that he has no plans to make any further episodes. The show has attracted praise from critics and has garnered numerous nominations, winning a number of awards.

Creation
Please Like Me was chiefly written by Josh Thomas, who also played the main character, Josh. Most episodes were directed by Matthew Saville. Thomas and producer Todd Abbott developed the series together for four years. They held a series of consultation meetings with the Australian Broadcasting Corporation. Abbott was careful to pitch the series as a drama rather than a sitcom. It portrays a set of circumstances that could happen to a young person but has humorous themes. Thomas envisioned an original show, something he had not seen on television before. The actor, also a known comedian in Australia, wanted honesty in the script and wrote the comedy with that in mind. He also wanted the actors to not intentionally react to the scripted jokes.

In January 2013, The West Australian reported that Please Like Me would air on ABC2. The show had been meant to air on ABC1, but it was decided that the show would be better suited to the digital channel ABC2. The broadcaster stated that the show is aimed at a younger demographic more appropriate for ABC2, while ABC1 caters to all ages. The move was criticised because it was believed to be the result of the Australian Broadcasting Corporation viewing the show's content as "too gay" for their primary channel. The series begins with Josh realising that he is gay and his mother attempting suicide with an overdose of Panadol.

In September 2013, ABC1 started running the series on Wednesday nights (10pm), six months after its original ABC2 run.

It was announced in July 2013 that the series would air in the United States as part of the launch programming of Pivot, a new digital cable and satellite television channel which released the first episode of the series online prior to its screening on the channel. It will also offer the series as part of its video on demand service. Pivot also launched a social media website "pleaselikeme.org" for viewers to share personal experiences about breaking stigma and fear of being unliked, in relation to the series.

On 26 July 2013, it was announced that ABC and Pivot had commissioned a second season of the show consisting of ten episodes. The season debuted in its American territory first from 8 August 2014. Producers also added a host of new regular characters to the cast. On 12 July 2014, it was announced that the networking partnership had renewed Please Like Me for a third series also comprising ten episodes. On 7 July 2016, the series was renewed for a fourth season consisting of six episodes. On 2 February 2017, it was announced that season 4 was the final season for the series.

Plot
Twenty something Josh is going through a number of big changes as he navigates his first decade of adulthood. After being dumped by his girlfriend, he comes to the realization that he is gay.

Cast

Notes

Episodes

Reception

Critical response
Anthony D. Langford from AfterElton.com said that he "absolutely loved this charming series. It’s funny and sweet and has plenty of heart." He also praised Thomas's portrayal of Josh and wished that US broadcasters could emulate the show's format. He later said that he would miss the show and hoped a second season would be commissioned. He added that he did not want to say goodbye to Josh's world. Andrew Mast, writing for Music.com.au, praised Briggs's "naturalistic performances" and the inclusion of accomplished actress Farr. He concluded that Thomas's writing was good and comedic, but the on-screen delivery did not meet his expectations. David Knox from TV Tonight praised the performances of many cast members. He opined that the dynamic between Josh and his parents created a "very rich comedic terrain" for the show. He added that Please Like Me displays "a confidence that delivers laughs, pathos and insight".

Colin Vickery and Darren Devlyn from News.com.au said that it "has a sweetness that sets it apart from other boundary-pushing comedies". Giles Hardie from The Age praised the show for "breaking new ground" and not making stereotypes of gay characters. He viewed the comedy as being genuine without feeling like a sitcom. He noted that coming out and attempted suicide are given humour without the gags. Hardie concluded that Josh, his family and friends were "incredibly well" played. His colleague Scott Ellis believed that Please Like Me was an important show and the type of material the ABC should be investing more in. He also branded it "gentle" and insightful when covering "tough ground". Fellow critic Craig Mathieson also agreed that the show's darker moments are some of the most humorous and compared it to US show Louie. Please Like Me received an invitation to screen at the Series Mania Television Festival in Paris.

The A.V. Club regarded season 2 of Please Like Me as one of the year's best shows, praising the camera work and Josh's performance. The Guardian praised Please Like Me's "unconventional writing".

Awards and nominations

See also
List of Australian television series
List of programs broadcast by ABC Television

References

External links

Official Takepart Website

2010s LGBT-related drama television series
2010s LGBT-related comedy television series
2013 Australian television series debuts
2013 American television series debuts
2016 Australian television series endings
Australian Broadcasting Corporation original programming
Pivot (TV network) original programming
Polyamory in fiction
Australian comedy-drama television series
Australian LGBT-related television shows
Gay-related television shows
Television about mental health
Bipolar disorder in fiction
Lesbian-related television shows
Suicide in television